Franco Calabrese (22 July 1923 in Palermo – 13 November 1992 in Lucca) was an Italian bass singer.

Biography 

Calabrese grew up in Lucca, graduating from the Boccherini Institute In 1947. He made his stage debut at the Teatro Comunale in Florence. In 1952, he debuted at La Scala as Angelloti in the famous de Sabata Tosca.

He was particularly renowned for his Mozart and Rossini roles, and among those, that of Don Alfonso in Cosi fan tutte, the Count Almaviva in The Marriage of Figaro. Calabrese appeared in this role in the noted 1955 recording, with Sesto Bruscanini, Graziella Sciuti and The Glyndebourne festival orchestra, under the baton of Vittorio Gui.

After retiring from singing, he taught stagecraft at the same Boccherini Institute in Lucca, where his students were, among others, Graziano Polidori, Giancarlo Ceccarini, Francesco Facini and Enrico Facini.

Discography (Incomplete) 
 Tosca, with Maria Callas and Giuseppe di Stefano. Victor de Sabata cond. at La Scala, EMI, 1952
 The Marriage of Figaro, with Sesto Bruscanini and Graziella Sciuti. Vittorio Gui cond. at Abbey Road Studios, HMV, 1955
 La traviata, with Anna Moffo and Richard Tucker. Fernando Previtali cond. at The Rome Opera, RCA, 1960
 La bohème, with Mirella Freni and Luciano Pavarotti. Thomas Schippers cond. at the RAI Auditorium in Rome, 1969

References

1923 births
1992 deaths
Italian basses
Operatic basses
Musicians from Palermo
20th-century Italian male  opera singers